The West Indies cricket team toured Pakistan in February to March 1959 and played a three-match Test series against the Pakistan national cricket team. Pakistan won the Test series 2–1. West Indies were captained by Gerry Alexander and Pakistan by Fazal Mahmood.

Test series summary

First Test

Second Test

Third Test

References

External links

1959 in Pakistani cricket
1959 in West Indian cricket
International cricket competitions from 1945–46 to 1960
Pakistani cricket seasons from 1947–48 to 1969–70
1959